Sandra Elaine Hutchins (born 1946) is an American computer scientist and communications engineer. Her area of expertise is speech recognition, that is, programming computers to process human voice. Hutchins' main focus is writing programs that will allow computers to recognize and respond to spoken English, thereby removing the need for a keyboard.

Education
Hutchins received her B.A. from the University of California, San Diego, in 1967. During her undergraduate studies, Hutchins majored in physics and minored in linguistics. In 1970, she received her Ph.D. in computer science, also from the University of California, San Diego.

Career
Hutchins' current research is interdisciplinary, straddling the fields of linguistics, physics, and computer science. She has worked both at universities and with corporations and holds at least two patents. One patent is for computer speech recognition programs that work in loud environments, and one patent concerns digital compression of speech.

She began working at Purdue University as an assistant professor and electrical engineer in 1970 and continued with this position through 1972. Hutchins then became the senior staff engineer in communications with TRW Defense and Space Systems, where she worked until 1977. During part of her time with TRW, Hutchins also served as an instructor at Loyola Marymount University, teaching from 1973 to 1974. After leaving TRW, she assumed the role of engineering manager for Linkabit Corporations, from 1977 to 1979. She then became the software development manager for ITT Defense Communications Division, from 1981 to 1982. In 1983, Hutchins became Chief Technical Officer for Natural Speech Technologies, a job she held until 2001. While at Natural Speech Technologies, she supervised the development of many educational games, programs, software, and puzzles. Several of these games were displayed at the Smithsonian Institution in 1985, as part of an exhibit on American games.

Hutchins currently works as the manager of Bloomberg LP in New York, where she has worked since 2001.

Membership
Hutchins is a member of the Association for Computing Machinery. She is also a member of the  Institute of Electrical and Electronics Engineers.

References

American women computer scientists
American computer scientists
Living people
University of California, San Diego alumni
1946 births
Place of birth missing (living people)
21st-century American women